Yuasa may refer to:

People

, Japanese breakdancer
, Japanese operatic singer
, Japanese naval officer
, Japanese composer
, Japanese military surgeon
, Japanese figure skater
, Japanese politician and bureaucrat
, Japanese film director
, Japanese alpine ski racer
, Japanese film director
, submission grappler and Brazilian jiu-jitsu (BJJ) black belt competitor
, Japanese lawyer
, Japanese musician and conductor
, Japanese nuclear physicist
, former Grand Steward of the Imperial Household Agency (2001–2005)
, Japanese philosopher of religion
, Japanese scholar and translator of Russian literature

Places
 Yuasa, Wakayama, Japan
 Yuasa Station, railway station at Yuasa, Wakayama

Other uses
 GS Yuasa, a Japanese company